Shanwei, or Swabue is a prefecture-level city in eastern Guangdong province, People's Republic of China. It borders Jieyang to the east, Meizhou and Heyuan to the north, Huizhou to the west, and looks out to the South China Sea to the south.

History
Shanwei City was established in 1988. It was politically administered as part of Huizhoufu (惠州府) by the Ming and Qing empires, Shanwei it gained its prefectural and administrative independence from Huizhou during the Nationalist period.

The dominant ethnic population is Hoklo who came as a result of the large decrease in population  caused by warfare in the early Qing dynasty in what is now Shanwei.

Administration
The prefecture-level city of Shanwei administers 4 county-level divisions, including 1 district, 1 county-level city and 2 counties.

These are further divided into 53 township-level divisions, including 40 towns, 10 townships and 3 subdistricts.

Geography and climate
Shanwei has a monsoon-influenced humid subtropical climate (Köppen Cwa), with short, mild to warm winters, and long, hot, humid summers. Winter begins sunny and dry but becomes progressively wetter and cloudier. Autumn is sunny and dry. With monthly percent possible sunshine ranging from 26% in March to 57% in October, the city receives 1,925 hours of bright sunshine annually.

Transportation

Xiamen–Shenzhen Railway.

Economy

Ties with Shenzhen
According to a December 2011 report, officials from Shenzhen considered Shanwei as one of the major destinations to which air-polluting industries should be relocated from Shenzhen. According to the mayor of Shenzhen, some 4000 Shenzhen factories should be moved to an industrial park in Shanwei.

Crops
Farming is a large part of Shanwei's economy, thanks to its relatively warm climate. Many different types of crops are planted, rice, sesame, sweet potatoes, corn, bananas, just to name a few. 29 families and 42 species of plants are planted in total, on its 96.6 thousand hectares of farmland. Together with the timber and fish industry, the agriculture industry makes 25099 million Chinese yuan yearly.

Fisheries
Shenwei have a rich and diverse sea ecosystem, it's a famous fishing ground in Guangdong. With a vast amount of fish, shrimp, crab, shellfish, and seaweed found, the fishing industry there has been thriving for centuries. Currently 25099 million Chinese yuan are earned from the fishing industry, including other harvest industries such as agriculture each year.

Tourism
With its long, interesting coastline and unique customs, Shanwei has an great potential for tourism. The few major tourist points in Shanwei are Lufeng Jieshi Xuanwu Mountain Tourist Area, Shanwei Fengshan Ancestral Temple Tourist Area, Red Bay Tourist Area, Haifeng Lotus Mountain Resort, Tongdingshan Tourist Area, Haifeng Red Palace Red Square Former Residence, Peng Pai Martyr's Former Residence, Shuide Mountain Tourist Resort, Luhe Luodong Shiwai Meiyuan Tourist Area, Lufeng Fushan Mazu Tourist Area, Lufeng Jinxiang Beach Seascape Area, Lufeng Qingyun Mountain, Luhe God Elephant Mountain Park, Luhe Red Spine Forest Ecological Park. It's also one of the 13 communist revolution starting points in China, which can be use as an selling point.

Recent history

On the night of December 6, 2005, a protest had broken out for land confiscated by the government. To calm the protest, armed police were sent to the village of Dongzhou after the aggressive villagers attacked the unarmed police. It was reported by the Chinese government that, three people were found dead after the protest. However, the number was doubted by media to be between 20 and 40.

Language
Generally used is Haklau Min which is similar to Hokkien and Teochew, belonging to the Southern Min division of Min Chinese. Haifeng, Lufeng and the urban area have basically the same accent. Most parts of the rural Luhe county formerly part of Lufeng use the rural Hakka Chinese language belonging to the Xinhui subdialect of the Yuetai dialect.

As Shanwei is near the Pearl River Delta and Hong Kong, together with the impact of television programs from Hong Kong and population movements within Guangdong province, many local residents, especially the younger generation, have communication skills in Cantonese.

References

External links

 (in Simplified Chinese)

 
Prefecture-level divisions of Guangdong